Both Sides with Jesse Jackson was an American weekly news show hosted by Jesse Jackson on CNN.

The show debuted in 1992 and was cancelled in 2000.

References

External links

1992 American television series debuts
2000 American television series endings
1990s American television news shows
2000s American television news shows
CNN original programming
Jesse Jackson